Kristofer Dahl (born July 7, 1992) is a Canadian cyclist. Dahl has competed internationally, representing Canada on numerous occasions. He currently resides in Calgary, Alberta.

Major results

2014
 1st  National Under-23 Time Trial Championships
 2nd National Under-23 Road Race Championships
2016
 1st Stage 1 Tour of Utah

References

External links
 

1992 births
Living people
Canadian male cyclists